Buckeye Valley High School is a rural public high school located in Delaware County's Troy Township, north of Delaware, Ohio. It is the only high school in the Buckeye Valley Local School District. The mascot is the Fighting Baron. BVHS was part of the Mid-Ohio Athletic Conference, but will be joining the Mid-State League in 2019.

History 
The Buckeye Valley High School Barons was established in 1963 as a consolidation of the Elm Valley (Ashley) Aces, the Radnor (Local) Trojans, and the Scioto Valley (Ostrander) Rockets. The high school building located on Coover Road in Troy Township still exists to this day. It has had one expansion in 1997 and was added onto once again in 2010. Over the years, BVHS had around 600 students; however, today it houses approximately 800 students in grades 9–12.

Music 
Buckeye Valley High School offers Marching Band, Concert Band, Jazz Band, and Various Vocal Music programs such as, Visions Show Choir, Barontonix, Men's Choir, and Chorale. In the fall, the school puts on a play, and in the winter the school puts on a musical.

External links

Notes and references

High schools in Delaware County, Ohio
Public high schools in Ohio